John Boullongne, Count de Nogent (1690–1769) was a French magistrate and politician.

Adviser to the parliament of Metz, then superintendent of finance, State Councilor, member of the Royal Council of Finance, he became controller general of finance on 25 August 1757, replacing Francois Marie Peyrenc de Moras. He remained in that position until 4 March 1759.

References

1690 births
1769 deaths
French Ministers of Finance